"True" is the debut single by English producer/rapper Jaimeson, released in January 2003. The song features Angel Blu as vocalist, with Jaimeson providing the rapping. The single peaked at number four on the UK Singles Chart.

Charts

Weekly charts

Year-end charts

References

2002 songs
2003 debut singles
Jaimeson songs
Virgin Records singles
UK Independent Singles Chart number-one singles